Landfill gas is a mix of different gases created by the action of microorganisms within a landfill as they decompose organic waste, including for example, food waste and paper waste. Landfill gas is approximately forty to sixty percent methane, with the remainder being mostly carbon dioxide. Trace amounts of other volatile organic compounds (VOCs) comprise the remainder (<1%). These trace gases include a large array of species, mainly simple hydrocarbons.

Landfill gases have an influence on climate change. The major components are CO2 and methane, both of which are greenhouse gasses. Methane in the atmosphere is a far more potent greenhouse gas, with each molecule having twenty-five times the effect of a molecule of carbon dioxide. Methane itself however accounts for less composition of the atmosphere than does carbon dioxide. Landfills are the third-largest source of methane in the US.

Because of the significant negative effects of these gases, regulatory regimes have been set up to monitor landfill gas, reduce the amount of biodegradable content in municipal waste, and to create landfill gas utilization strategies, which include gas flaring or capture for electricity generation.

Production
Landfill gases are the result of three processes:
 evaporation of volatile organic compounds (e.g., solvents)
 chemical reactions between waste components
 microbial action, especially methanogenesis. 
The first two depend strongly on the nature of the waste. The dominant process in most landfills is the third process whereby anaerobic bacteria decompose organic waste to produce biogas, which consists of methane and carbon dioxide together with traces of other compounds. Despite the heterogeneity of waste, the evolution of gases follows well defined kinetic pattern. Formation of methane and CO2 commences about six months after depositing the landfill material. The evolution of gas reaches a maximum at about 20 years, then declines over the course of decades.

When landfill gas permeates through a soil cover, a fraction of the methane in the gas is oxidized microbially to CO2.

Monitoring

Because gases produced by landfills are both valuable and sometimes hazardous, monitoring techniques have been developed. Flame ionization detectors can be used to measure methane levels as well as total VOC levels. Surface monitoring and sub-surface monitoring as well as monitoring of the ambient air is carried out. In the U.S., under the Clean Air Act of 1990, it is required that many large landfills install gas collection and control systems, which means that at the very least the facilities must collect and flare the gas.

U.S. Federal regulations under Subtitle D of RCRA formed in October 1979 regulate the siting, design, construction, operation, monitoring, and closure of MSW landfills. Subtitle D now requires controls on the migration of methane in landfill gas. Monitoring requirements must be met at landfills during their operation, and for an additional 30 years after. The landfills affected by Subtitle D of RCRA are required to control gas by establishing a way to check for methane emissions periodically and therefore prevent off-site migration. Landfill owners and operators must make sure the concentration of methane gas does not exceed 25% of the LEL for methane in the facilities' structures and the LEL for methane at the facility boundary.

Use

The gases produced within a landfill can be collected and used in various ways. The landfill gas can be utilized directly on-site by a boiler or any type of combustion system, providing heat. Electricity can also be generated on-site through the use of microturbines, steam turbines, or fuel cells. The landfill gas can also be sold off-site and sent into natural gas pipelines. This approach requires the gas to be processed into pipeline quality, e.g., by removing various contaminants and components. Landfill gas can also be used to evaporate leachate, another byproduct of the landfill process. This application displaces another fuel that was previously used for the same thing.

The efficiency of gas collection at landfills directly impacts the amount of energy that can be recovered - closed landfills (those no longer accepting waste) collect gas more efficiently than open landfills (those that are still accepting waste). A comparison of collection efficiency at closed and open landfills found about a 17 percentage point difference between the two.

Opposition
Capture and use of landfill gas can be expensive. Some environmental groups claim that the projects do not produce "renewable power" because trash (their source) is not renewable. The Sierra Club opposes government subsidies for such projects. The Natural Resources Defense Council (NRDC) argues that government incentives should be directed more towards solar, wind, and energy-efficiency efforts.

Safety
Landfill gas emissions can lead to environmental, hygiene and security problems in the landfill. Several accidents have occurred, for example at Loscoe, England in 1986, where migrating landfill gas accumulated and partially destroyed a property. An accident causing two deaths occurred from an explosion in a house adjacent to Skellingsted landfill in Denmark in 1991. Due to the risk presented by landfill gas, there is a clear need to monitor gas produced by landfills. In addition to the risk of fire and explosion, gas migration in the subsurface can result in contact with landfill gas with groundwater. This, in turn, can result in contamination of groundwater by organic compounds present in nearly all landfill gas.

Although usually evolved only in trace amounts, landfills do release some aromatics and chlorocarbons.

Landfill gas migration, due to pressure differentials and diffusion, can occur. This can create an explosion hazard if the gas reaches sufficiently high concentrations in adjacent buildings.

By country

Brazil

United States

See also

Anaerobic digestion
Biodegradability
Biogas
Flue gas
Landfill gas utilization
Relative cost of electricity generated by different sources
Underground coal gasification

References

External links
 GA Mansoori, N Enayati, LB Agyarko (2016), Energy: Sources, Utilization, Legislation, Sustainability, Illinois as Model State, World Sci. Pub. Co., 
 
 
 
 
 

Landfill
Anaerobic digestion
Industrial gases